Squeeze Play is an Ultra High Fidelity monaural phonographic album (33 RPM) which was released on the Dot Records label in 1956 (DLP-3024) featuring John Serry Sr. It includes an original composition by Serry, classical works, and popular music of the era. Ben Selvin serves as the musical director/producer for the album. The works were arranged by Serry and performed with his ensemble featuring two accordions, piano, guitar, bass, drum, vibes, and marimba.

The liner notes of the album claim that

The album was cited in a critical review of new popular albums of 1956 in The Billboard magazine and was described as providing beautiful performances which created a soothing mood, in contrast to common entertainment. The album was also reviewed in The Cash Box magazine later that year. Serry's performances were noted for establishing a variety of musical moods with grace while also emphasizing a relaxed performance style. In 1958 selected songs from the album were released in France by Versailles records (#90 M 1788) as Chicago Musette - John Serry et son accordéon.  A copy of the album and the composer's original orchestral score have been donated for archival purposes to the Eastman School of Music's Sibley Music Library within the Ruth T. Watanabe Special Collections Department for the benefit of researchers and students.

Track listing
Side One

"Garden in Monaco" (Arr. John Serry Sr.)  – 2:58
"Terry's Theme" - (Charles Chaplin)  – 2:39
"When My Dreamboat Comes Home" - (Cliff Friend, Dave Franklin)  – 2:31
"Blue Bell" - (S. Stanley)  – 2:15
"Rockin' The Anvil" - melodic theme by Giuseppe Verdi (See Anvil Chorus)/ music John Serry Sr. – 2:35
 "Secret Love" - (Paul Francis Webster, Sammy Fain)  – 2:18

Side Two

"Granada"- (Agustín Lara)  – 3:14
"Side by Side" - (Harry M. Woods)  – 2:18
"My Heart Cries for You" - (Percy Faith, Carl Sigman)  – 1:58
"Hawaiian Night" - (Hans Carste, Francis Vincente)  – 2:37
"Button Up Your Overcoat" - (Buddy DeSylva, Lew Brown, Ray Henderson) – 2:14
"Rock 'N' Roll Polka" - (Mort Lindsey, George Skinner)  – 2:37

Ensemble artists
 John Serry Sr. - Lead Accordion/Conductor 
 Alf Nystrom - Accordion
 Bernie Leighton - Piano 
 Al Caiola - Guitar 
 Frank Carroll - Bass
 Charlie Roeder - Drums
 Harry Breur - Vibes/Marimba

References

External links
Worldcat.org -Libraries circulating copies of Squeeze Play
- Squeeze Play  - album recording on archive.org

1956 albums
John Serry Sr. albums
Dot Records albums
Albums conducted by John Serry Sr.
Albums arranged by John Serry Sr.
Jazz albums by American artists
Jazz-pop albums